Ascanio Piccolomini (died 13 May 1597) was a Roman Catholic prelate who served as Archbishop of Siena (1588–1597) and Titular Archbishop of Colossae (1579–1588).

Biography
On 3 July 1579, Ascanio Piccolomini was appointed during the papacy of Pope Gregory XIII as Coadjutor Archbishop of Siena and Titular Archbishop of Colossae.
On 11 September 1579, he was consecrated bishop by Spinello Benci, Bishop of Montepulciano, with Claudio Borghese, Bishop of Grosseto, and Francesco Maria Piccolomini, Bishop of Pienza, serving as co-consecrators. 
In 1588, he succeeded to the bishopric of Siena.
He served as Archbishop of Siena until his death on 13 May 1597.

While bishop, he was the principal co-consecrator of Antonio Fera, Bishop of Marsico Nuovo (1584).

References

External links and additional sources
 (for Chronology of Bishops) 
 (for Chronology of Bishops) 

16th-century Italian Roman Catholic bishops
Bishops appointed by Pope Gregory XIII
1597 deaths
House of Piccolomini